The 2017 STP 500 was a Monster Energy NASCAR Cup Series race held on April 2, 2017, at Martinsville Speedway in Ridgeway, Virginia. Contested over 500 laps on the .526 mile (.847 km) paperclip-shaped short track, it was sixth race of the 2017 Monster Energy NASCAR Cup Series season.

Report

Background

Martinsville Speedway is an International Speedway Corporation-owned NASCAR stock car racing track located in Henry County, in Ridgeway, Virginia, just to the south of Martinsville. At  in length, it is the shortest track in the NASCAR Sprint Cup Series. The track was also one of the first paved oval tracks in NASCAR, being built in 1947 by H. Clay Earles. It is also the only remaining race track that has been on the NASCAR circuit from its beginning in 1948.

Entry list

First practice

Qualifying
Qualifying for Friday was cancelled due to rain and Kyle Larson, the point leader, was awarded the pole as a result.

Starting Lineup

Practice (post-qualifying)

Second practice

Final practice

Race

First stage
Kyle Larson led the field to the green flag at 2:18 p.m. He led the first 24 laps before giving way to Brad Keselowski on lap 25. The first caution flew on lap 69 when Ricky Stenhouse Jr. spun out in Turn 3. Trevor Bayne, Keselowski, Michael McDowell (speeding) and Joey Logano (crew member over the wall too soon) restarted the race from the tail-end of the field. Earnhardt said after the race that based on "what I see on my dash I wasn’t speeding, but (NASCAR) has better technology than we do. They said it was in the segment out of my pit box. Hell, I must have got out of there pretty damn good. I don’t know what to do about that." As a result of Keselowski's penalty, Martin Truex Jr., who was running second at the time, assumed the lead.

The race restarted on lap 76. Denny Hamlin passed Truex for the lead on lap 89. Jamie McMurray made contact with Jimmie Johnson on lap 100 and developed a left-rear tire rub that cut down the tire, led to him spinning out and hitting the Turn 3 wall on lap 106, bringing out the second caution. McMurray went on to finish last.

The race restarted on lap 117. The third caution flew on lap 123 when Dale Earnhardt Jr. got loose exiting Turn 2, and received help from Ryan Blaney, and spun out on the backstretch.

The race restarted on lap 127. Truex won the first stage and the fourth caution flew for the conclusion of the stage. Kyle Busch exited pit road with the race lead.

Second stage
The race restarted on lap 141. Chase Elliott took the lead from Busch on lap 145, only for Busch to pass under Elliott in Turn 2 to retake it on lap 152. Logano made an unscheduled stop for a flat left-rear tire on lap 230. In the closing laps of the stage, Busch drove to the outside of Stenhouse going into Turn 3 on lap 257 when Stenhouse made contact with him to try and stay on the lead lap. On the last lap of the stage, Stenhouse bumped Busch out of the groove, allowing Elliott to pass Busch for the lead and win the second stage, as the fifth caution flew on lap 260 for the conclusion of the stage. Busch was asked after the race if what Stenhouse did was fair, and he said it is "if you expect it back. I actually was rolling into Turn 3 and was kind of going higher out of my way in order to let the 17 [of Stenhouse] back by and give him the lap. That was my intent, and then he just drove through me. It cost me my spot to the 24 [of Chase Elliott], so I was hoping that I could run off the corner side by side with the 17 and keep the 24 at bay and just keep my nose in front of his and be able to score the segment, and I was trying to be a nice guy, but nice guys don't finish first."

Final stage
The race restarted on lap 272 and Busch took back the lead. Debris in Turn 2 brought out the sixth caution on lap 278.

The race restarted on lap 284. Exiting Turn 4 on lap 287, Erik Jones made contact with the outside wall, came down across the nose of Austin Dillon going into Turn 1 and got nudged out of the groove. Hamlin got into Dillon and turned him, and the domino effect resulted in heavy damage to the cars of Kurt Busch and Daniel Suárez. This brought out the seventh caution.

The race restarted with 206 laps to go and the eighth caution flew a lap later when Busch's damaged 41 car blew a left-front tire and slammed the wall in Turn 3.

The race restarted with 198 to go. The ninth caution flew with 192 to go when Gray Gaulding spun out in Turn 3.

The race restarted with 187 to go. The 10th caution flew with 167 to go when Reed Sorenson spun out in Turn 3. Hamlin and Stenhouse stayed out to assume the race lead. Kasey Kahne restarted the race from the tail-end of the field for speeding on pit road.

The race restarted with 160 to go and Kyle Busch took the lead back with ease on the restart. The 11th caution flew with 109 to go when Jeffrey Earnhardt blew a right-front tire and slammed the wall exiting Turn 2. Aric Almirola, Bayne and Earnhardt restarted the race from the tail-end of the field for speeding.

The race restarted with 101 to go. Keselowski retook the lead with 94 to go just as Matt DiBenedetto spun out in Turn 3, bringing out the 12th caution.

The race restarted with 86 to go and Busch powered by Keselowski on the outside lane exiting Turn 2 to take the lead. The next lap, Hamlin got loose and made contact with Danica Patrick and sent her spinning. The resulting domino effect led to Bayne pushing Hamlin into the wall and Earnhardt slamming into the back of teammate Kahne, puncturing his radiator. Earnhardt said the cars ahead of him "just stopped and I couldn't. I got into the back of (Kahne). His bumper knocked the top of the radiator off of it, knocked the fitting off the top of the radiator. We don't have much of a bumper on there to begin with keeping the cars as light as we can and that is about the second or third time I've knocked the top off the radiator here. I wish they were a little tougher than that, so we could beat and bang and keep going." This brought out the 13th caution.

The race restarted with 74 to go. The 14th caution flew with 69 to go for Truex spinning in Turn 4.

The race restarted with 64 to go and Keselowski regained the lead. Busch took it back with 56 to go. For the next 14 laps, Keselowski kept to the rear bumper of the 18 car, took the lead going into Turn 1 with 42 to go and drove on to score the victory.

Post-race

Driver comments
“This is awesome,” Keselowski said in victory lane. “We’ve ran so good here with the Miller Lite Ford, but something always happens and we haven't been able to bring it home. Martinsville is just one of those champion’s tracks. The guys that run well everywhere run well here, and it's really just an honor to win here and get to compete here. This track is 70 years old and a lot of legends have won here. It feels great to be able to join them and bring home a clock.”

“All we did was put four tires on it and it went to junk,” Busch said after leading a race high of 274 laps. “I hate it for our guys. They've deserved all year much better finishes than what we’ve been able to produce and here's another one today.”

Elliott, who finished third, said he was "proud of our improvements this weekend. I hope that it wasn’t just a fluke deal and we didn’t just get lucky today and run good. I really hope that we’ve found something or I have found something at this track that will lend some more consistent finishes that are further towards the front.”

Dillon, who rallied from a multi-car wreck in the middle of the race to finish fifth, said of the final run he "thought we were going to have a little something for the two leaders, but in middle of the run, our car just lacked a little bit more turn and forward drive," Dillon said. "Then at the end we could come back to them again. I think I was running the 22 (fourth-place finisher Joey Logano) back down there at the end. Just proud of my guys and thankful for this run – we needed it."

Race results

Stage results

Stage 1
Laps: 130

Stage 2
Laps: 130

Final stage results

Stage 3
Laps: 240

Race statistics
 Lead changes: 7 among different drivers
 Cautions/Laps: 14 for 95
 Red flags: 0
 Time of race: 3 hours, 44 minutes and 59 seconds
 Average speed:

Media

Television
Fox Sports was covering their 17th race at the Martinsville Speedway. Mike Joy, nine-time Martinsville winner Jeff Gordon and 11-time Martinsville winner Darrell Waltrip called in the booth for the race. Jamie Little, Chris Neville and Matt Yocum handled pit road duties for the entire race.

Radio
MRN had the radio call for the race which would also be simulcasted on Sirius XM NASCAR Radio. Joe Moore, Jeff Striegle and seven-time Martinsville winner Rusty Wallace called the race in the booth as the cars were on the frontstretch. Dave Moody called the race from atop the turn 3 stands as the field is racing down the backstretch. Alex Hayden, Winston Kelley and Steve Post worked pit road for the radio side.

Standings after the race

Drivers' Championship standings

Manufacturers' Championship standings

Note: Only the first 16 positions are included for the driver standings.

References

STP 500
STP 500
STP 500
NASCAR races at Martinsville Speedway